George Rodgers (7 November 1925 – 15 February 2000) was a British Labour Party politician.

Rodgers was Member of Parliament (MP) for the marginal Chorley seat from 1974 to 1979, when he lost to the Conservative Den Dover.

Biography

Early life 
Rodgers was born in Liverpool, the son of a joiner, and educated locally. During the second world war, he served in the navy (1943–46), earning decorations after dangerous Arctic convoys and on the Normandy landings.

Back home, he trained as a welder, working first for White's in Widnes, then Eaves in Blackpool, Costain's and, finally, BICC. Like most leftwing engineers, George was active both in his union and in local politics. He was heavily involved in the Amalgamated Engineering Union. In 1964, he was elected to Huyton local council, later becoming its chairman.

Member of Parliament 
Rodgers was persuaded to go for the marginal Chorley seat, which had been tenuously held for Labour by a local sheep-farmer Clifford Kenyon and lost to Conservative, Constance Monks the prior election. He won the seat by 405 votes in February 1974, during the election which brought Harold Wilson unexpectedly back to power. The MP then increased his majority to a 2,713 the following election in October of that year.

George was lately popular with fellow Labour MPs, becoming chairman of their north-west group. Pro-Arab and anti-common market, he pushed for industrial investment to mop up unemployment. He found the existence of the House of Lords "an offensive absurdity". He was considered a member of Old Labour due to his connections with trade unions.

In 1979, he lost his seat to Conservative, Den Dover, as part of a slue of wins for the Conservative leader, Margaret Thatcher.

George tried for Pendle in 1983, and in 1986 was on Labour's shortlist at the Knowsley North by-election. But the man selected was his daughter Julie's husband, Sir George Howarth, now the Parliamentary Under-Secretary of State for Northern Ireland.

He specifically did not request a life peerage from the Prime Minister after he lost his seat.

Legacy 
Rodgers died in 2000 aged 74, leaving behind a wife, two daughters and a son.

He spent his life serving the Labour Party and Unions.

References
Times Guide to the House of Commons 1979

External links 
 
The Guardian Obituary of George Rodgers

1925 births
2000 deaths
Amalgamated Engineering Union-sponsored MPs
Labour Party (UK) MPs for English constituencies
UK MPs 1974
UK MPs 1974–1979